is a former Japanese television and radio announcer who was represented with Cent Force.

Current appearances

TV programmes

Radio

Former appearances
As an Akita Broadcasting System announcer

As a free announcer

Others

Stage

Books

Magazines

Serials

DVD

Advertisements

References

External links

news every. caster profiles 
'Ayako Ito Madobe de Branch 

Japanese announcers
People from Akita Prefecture
1980 births
Living people